The 1783 Vermont Republic gubernatorial election took place throughout September, and resulted in the re-election of Thomas Chittenden to a one-year term.

The Vermont General Assembly met in Westminster on October 9. The Vermont House of Representatives appointed a committee to examine the votes of the freemen of Vermont for governor, lieutenant governor, treasurer, and governor's council members. Thomas Chittenden was re-elected to a one-year term as governor.

In the election for lieutenant governor, Paul Spooner was re-elected to a second one-year term. In addition, Ira Allen was re-elected to a one-year term as treasurer. The names of candidates and balloting totals were not recorded.

Results

References

Vermont gubernatorial elections
1783 in Vermont
1783 elections in North America